Cooper-Saeed waves refer to donor heart conducted P waves on the 12-lead ECG tracing of heart transplant recipients, also demonstrating nonconducted P waves of the recipient heart.

References

Cardiac arrhythmia